The Three E.P.'s is a compilation album of the first three releases by Scottish musical group The Beta Band, comprising the EPs Champion Versions, The Patty Patty Sound and Los Amigos del Beta Bandidos. The album was released on 28 September 1998 in the United Kingdom by Regal and on 26 January 1999 in the United States by Astralwerks. Its cover art includes the main image from each of the EPs.

The Three E.P.'s was prominently featured in a scene from the 2000 film High Fidelity, in which record store owner Rob Gordon (John Cusack) tells his co-workers that he would sell five copies of the album, and plays "Dry the Rain" in his store for his customers. Astralwerks, the band's American label, reported that sales of The Three E.P.'s had quadrupled within a month of the film's March 2000 release.

Critical reception

In 2000, Q magazine placed The Three E.P.'s at number 74 in its list of the 100 Greatest British Albums Ever. Pitchfork placed the album at number 23 in its list of the Top 100 Albums of the 1990s.

Track listing

Charts

Notes

The Beta Band albums
1998 compilation albums
Astralwerks compilation albums
Virgin Records compilation albums
Post-rock albums by Scottish artists
Experimental pop albums